Dieudonné Costes (14 November 1892 – 18 May 1973) was a French aviator who set flight distance records. He was also a fighter ace during World War I.

Early life and military service
Costes was born in Septfonds, Tarn-et-Garonne. He received a pilot diploma (brevet) on 26 September 1912. During World War I, he served in the French Air Service, in MF55 and MF85 Farman squadrons, then in N506, N507 and N531 fighter Nieuport squadrons, on the Balkan front. He scored 9 victories (6 confirmed) there, the first in April 1917, the rest in January–September 1918. He ended the war as a 2nd Lieutenant. .

After the war, he flew in civil aviation, starting with Latecoere in 1920, on the Toulouse-Casablanca mail route, then flying on the Bordeaux-Paris route in 1921 and on the Paris-London route in Air Union airlines in 1923. From 1925, he became a test pilot in Breguet works. He then started to perform long-distance and record breaking flights with Breguet 19 aircraft.

He was married to the actress Mary Costes (née Princess Vatchnadze).

Long-distance flights
On 26 September 1926, he flew 4,100 km (2,546 miles) from Paris to Assuan, with René de Vitrolles, attempting to break a world distance record. He broke the world distance record on 28 October 1926, flying 5,396 km (3,351 miles) from Paris to Jask, Persia, with J. Rignot, as part of a 19,625-km (12,187-mile) Paris-India-Paris flight.

Between 10 October 1927 and 14 April 1928, Costes and Joseph Le Brix flew 57,410 km (35,652 miles) around the world, in a Breguet 19GR named Nungesser-Coli, from Paris through Argentina, Brazil, the United States, Japan, India, and Greece, although they travelled across the Pacific Ocean from San Francisco, California, to Tokyo, Japan, by ship. During the trip, they made the first non-stop aerial crossing of the South Atlantic Ocean on 14–15 October 1927, flying between Saint-Louis, Senegal, and  Natal, Brazil. While in South America, they routed themselves through every country in the continent. On 15–17 December 1928, Costes, with Paul Codos, set a world distance record in a closed circuit of 8,029 km (4,986 miles).

On 13 July 1929, Costes and Maurice Bellonte made an attempt at crossing the North Atlantic Ocean westbound, from Villacoublay near Paris to New York, New York, flying the Breguet 19 Super Bidon "?" ("Point d'Interrogation" or "Question Mark"). They returned after 17 hours, however, due to bad weather. On 27–29 September 1929, they set the world distance record, flying 7,905 km (4,909 miles) from Paris to Qiqihar, China.

On 1–2 September 1930, Costes with Maurice Bellonte, flew the "Point d'Interrogation" from Paris to New York, as the first heavier-than-air aircraft to reach New York in the more difficult westbound direction between the North American and European mainlands. They covered either 5,850 km (3,633 miles) or 6,200 km (3,850 miles), according to different sources, in 37 hours 18 minutes. While flying over Portsmouth, New Hampshire, they lost their navigational map out of an open window of the plane. Two children saw the map falling from the sky while they were watching for the flight to cross over their farm. The children, Louise Stef and her brother John, returned the map to Costes, who had asked for its return through the media.

During World War II, Costes was an instructor in a pilots school in Versailles, with the rank of lieutenant colonel. He died on 18 May 1973 in Paris and is buried in Passy Cemetery.

Awards
Costes received the Legion of Honour, the Croix de Guerre with seven palms and a gold star, and the Médaille militaire, among other decorations. He also received the 1929 Fédération Aéronautique Internationale Gold Medal and the 1929 Harmon Trophy.

On 2 May 1928, he was awarded the Distinguished Flying Cross by special act of the Congress of the United States in recognition of his historic around the world flight.

References
General
Tadeusz Malinowski: "Lotnicy świata", Warszawa 1985,  (in Polish)
Dieudonné COSTES - Biographie d'un aviateur Septfontois
 Hagedorn, Dan: Conquistadors of the Sky: A History of Aviation in Latin America. University Press of Florida, 2008. , .
Complete biography, list of WW1 victories, and color profiles of his planes during WW1
The Aerodrome
"Air Progress from Lindbergh to Coste." Popular Science, November 1930, pp. 42–43.
 Franks, Norman; Bailey, Frank (1993). Over the Front: The Complete Record of the Fighter Aces and Units of the United States and French Air Services, 1914–1918. London, UK: Grub Street Publishing. .
Specific

1892 births
1973 deaths
People from Tarn-et-Garonne
French World War I flying aces
Flight distance record holders
Harmon Trophy winners
Burials at Passy Cemetery
Aviation pioneers
French aviation record holders